Kamkhan (also Romanized as Kāmkhān and Kām Khān) is a village in Dust Mohammad Rural District, in the Central District of Hirmand County, Sistan and Baluchestan Province, Iran. At the 2006 census, its population was 177, in 50 families.

References 

Populated places in Hirmand County